Gulshan Rai Mehra (16 April 1937 – 30 May 1986) was an Indian cricketer. He played 39 first-class matches for Delhi between 1957 and 1967.

See also
 List of Delhi cricketers

References

External links
 

1937 births
1986 deaths
Indian cricketers
Delhi cricketers
Cricketers from Delhi